The Queen of Versailles is a 2012 American documentary film by Lauren Greenfield. The film depicts Jackie Siegel and David Siegel, owners of Westgate Resorts, and their family as they build their private residence – Versailles, one of the largest and most expensive single-family houses in the United States – and the crisis they face as the US economy declines.

Synopsis
David Siegel is the wealthy owner of Westgate Resorts, a timeshare company in Florida. His wife Jackie Siegel, thirty years his junior, was the winner of the Mrs. Florida pageant in 1993. They begin construction on the Versailles house, a vast mansion named after the Palace of Versailles. Located on the outskirts of Orlando, it would be one of the largest single-family detached homes in the United States if completed (the largest being North Carolina's Biltmore Estate at 178,926 square feet).

However, Siegel's company is badly affected by the Great Recession in 2008, and his family struggles to cope with their reduced income. Construction on the new house is halted, most of their servants are laid off, and their pets are neglected. David retreats into his office, determined to save his Las Vegas property venture, PH Towers. Jackie struggles to rein in her compulsive shopping habits. The children and their nanny are also interviewed. The film ends with none of their issues resolved.

Reception
The film was reviewed positively. The film-critics aggregator Rotten Tomatoes reported 95 percent of critics gave a positive review, with an average score of 8/10 and the consensus, "The Queen of Versailles is a timely, engaging, and richly drawn portrait of the American Dream improbably composed of equal parts compassion and schadenfreude." The New York Times A. O. Scott called the film "A gaudy guilty pleasure that is also a piece of trenchant social criticism", and said, 

The Economist called it "an uncomfortably intimate glimpse of a couple's struggle with a harsh new reality," concluding that "the film's great achievement is that it invites both compassion and Schadenfreude. What could have been merely a silly send-up manages to be a meditation on marriage and a metaphor for the fragility of fortunes, big and small." Allmovie.com gave the film four stars out of five.

Awards
The documentary won the US Directing Award at the 2012 Sundance Film Festival, the Grand Jury Prize from the Brisbane International Film Festival, and a Best Director Award from the RiverRun Film Festival. The Queen of Versailles was also nominated for Best Documentary Film, 2012, by the International Documentary Association (IDA). It was broadcast on BBC Four as part of the Storyville series.

It was also nominated for the Critics' Choice Award for Best Documentary Feature.

Lawsuits
In January 2012, before the film's premiere at the Sundance Film Festival, David Siegel filed a civil action based on the way the film had been described in promotional materials.

On January 24, 2013, the United States District Court, Middle District of Florida, stayed the suit pending arbitration. Siegel claimed Greenfield had not obtained a proper release from the subjects of the film, in particular, David Siegel and Westgate Resorts. In staying the lawsuit, Judge Anne C. Conway found David Siegel's testimony to be "inconsistent and incredible and thus lacking weight." She disagreed with Siegel's position, which she deemed to be "quite bizarre" in light of his subsequent conduct. Directing that the case be administratively closed, Conway ordered the defendants to file and serve, on or before May 1, 2013, and every three months after that, a status report regarding the arbitration proceedings.

The subsequent arbitration was heard by Roy Rifkin of the Independent Film and Television Alliance in July 2013. On March 13, 2014, he returned his ruling that the film was not defamatory. He elaborated, "having viewed the supposedly egregious portions of the Motion Picture numerous times, [the arbitrator] simply does not find that any of the content of the Motion Picture was false." Furthermore, he wrote that "There is nothing taken away by the viewer of the Motion Picture that is inconsistent with the fundamental reality that the global recession created a crisis for Westgate causing it to have to reluctantly give up its interest in PH Towers," and "To a great extent this is derived from the words of David, Jackie, and Richard Siegel themselves. Perhaps the clearest example of this is David referring to the story being told as a 'rags-to-riches-to-rags story.'" Lastly, Rifkin found that Westgate failed to show how it was damaged from the documentary, saying that the company "did not remotely establish the type of malice required for a defamation claim on behalf of a public figure." He subsequently ordered David Siegel and Westgate Resorts to pay the filmmakers $750,000 for legal fees.

In a separate arbitration, Greg Derin of the American Arbitration Association ruled on February 28, 2014, that the filmmakers' agreement with the family, pertaining to certain life rights, was "invalid and unenforceable". The Siegels' attempt to sue for $5 million in damages was also dismissed by Derin.

Postscript
	
As Westgate Resorts' finances have improved since 2013, Siegel owns the Versailles property outright. Construction has resumed, but as of 2018 is still not complete. Expected to be valued at over $100 million, the project will be the fourth most expensive house in the United States. David Siegel and Westgate Resorts continue to operate a timeshare business, but without the PH Towers featured in the documentary. As a privately held enterprise, it is unknown how much of the $1.2 billion in debt Westgate Resorts continues to owe its lenders (originally reported by Businessweek on March 15, 2012).

Broadway Musical
In 2023, it was announced that the documentary has been adapted to be a Broadway Musical starring Kristin Chenoweth and with music to be composed by Stephen Schwartz (composer).

References

External links

Court order (United States District Court, Middle District of Florida, Jan. 24, 2013)
Interview on WNYC Leonard Lopate show July 16, 2012 with director
Interview of Lauren Greenfield by Jian Ghomeshi for CBC Radio, Aug. 13, 2012

2012 films
2012 documentary films
American documentary films
Culture of Orlando, Florida
Documentary films about consumerism
Documentary films about the Great Recession
Films scored by Jeff Beal
Siegel family
Sundance Film Festival award winners
Documentary films about Florida
2010s English-language films
2010s American films